Edmond E-Min Chang (born October 1970) is a United States district judge of the United States District Court for the Northern District of Illinois.

Early life and education 

Born in New York, New York to immigrants from Taiwan, Chang earned a Bachelor of Science in Engineering degree in aerospace engineering in 1991 from the University of Michigan and a Juris Doctor in 1994 from Northwestern University School of Law. From 1994 until 1995, Chang served as a law clerk for United States Court of Appeals for the Sixth Circuit Judge James L. Ryan. From 1995 until 1997, Chang served as a law clerk for United States District Court for the Northern District of Illinois Judge Marvin Aspen.

Professional career 

From 1997 until 1999, Chang served as an associate at the Chicago headquarters office of the global law firm Sidley Austin. In 1999, Chang became an Assistant United States Attorney in Chicago, serving as a Deputy Chief of General Crimes from 2004 until 2005 and as the Chief of Appeals for the Criminal Division from 2005 until late 2010.

Federal judicial service 

In 2009, Chang submitted an application to an Illinois screening committee for one of three federal district judgeship vacancies. On April 21, 2010, President Obama nominated Chang to a federal judgeship to fill the seat vacated by Judge Elaine E. Bucklo, who assumed senior status on October 31, 2009. On December 18, 2010, the United States Senate confirmed Chang by unanimous consent. He received his commission on December 20, 2010.

See also 
 List of Asian American jurists

References

External links

1970 births
Living people
Lawyers from New York City
American lawyers of Chinese descent
Judges of the United States District Court for the Northern District of Illinois
United States district court judges appointed by Barack Obama
Assistant United States Attorneys
American people of Taiwanese descent
American jurists of Chinese descent
American jurists of Taiwanese descent
Northwestern University Pritzker School of Law alumni
University of Michigan College of Engineering alumni
People from Northbrook, Illinois
21st-century American judges
The Bronx High School of Science alumni